Nadurra is the eighth studio album by folk rock band Capercaillie. It was released in 2000.

Track listing
 "Skye Waulking Song" - 4:38
 "Hope Springs Eternal" - 4:36
 "Michael's Matches" - 4:15
 "Tighinn Air A'Mhuir Am Fear A Phosas Mi" - 3:45
 "Hoireann O" - 4:01
 "Truth Calling" - 4:57 
 "Argyll Lassies" - 4:47
 "Mo Chailin Dileas Donn" - 3:56
 "Rapture" - 3:52
 "The Hollybush" - 5:23
 "Gaol Troimh Aimsirean" - 5:13
 "The Cockerel in the Creel" - 5:07

References

Capercaillie (band) albums
2000 albums
Scottish Gaelic music